Marion Township is a township in Davis County, Iowa, USA.  As of the 2000 census, its population was 218.

History
Marion Township was organized in 1846. It is named for General Francis Marion.

Geography
Marion Township covers an area of 35.66 square miles (92.35 square kilometers); of this, 0.34 square miles (0.89 square kilometers) or 0.96 percent is water. The streams of Pee Dee Creek, Pepper Creek and South Soap Creek run through this township.

Unincorporated towns
 Ash Grove
 Blackhawk
(This list is based on USGS data and may include former settlements.)

Adjacent townships
 Adams Township, Wapello County (north)
 Green Township, Wapello County (northeast)
 Soap Creek Township (east)
 Drakesville Township (southeast)
 Fox River Township (south)
 Udell Township, Appanoose County (southwest)
 Union Township, Appanoose County (west)
 Urbana Township, Monroe County (northwest)

Cemeteries
The township contains eight cemeteries: Adams, Bailey, Edwards, Glassburner, Hanson, Mounts, Wesley Chapel and Wheeler.

References
 U.S. Board on Geographic Names (GNIS)
 United States Census Bureau cartographic boundary files

External links
 US-Counties.com
 City-Data.com

Townships in Davis County, Iowa
Townships in Iowa